Sanima Mai Hydropower Station is a run-of-the-river hydroelectric power station with an installed capacity of 22 MW. This power station is located at Gunmune and Chisapani VDC in Ilam district of Nepal. Construction began in 2010 and all major works were completed by October 2014. However, the power station was not operational at the time due to an unfinished transmission line. The plant became fully operational on February 26, 2015.

The plant is operated by Sanima Mai Hydropower Limited, a public company developing various hydropower projects in Nepal.

See also

Mai Cascade Hydropower Plant
List of power stations in Nepal

References

Hydroelectric power stations in Nepal
Gravity dams
Run-of-the-river power stations
Dams in Nepal
Energy infrastructure completed in 2015
2015 establishments in Nepal
Buildings and structures in Ilam District